Guy Alexis Herbulot (7 March 1925 – 1 August 2021) was a French Roman Catholic prelate. He was ordained a priest in 1950. Herbulot served as the bishop of Évry-Corbeil-Essonnes from 1978 until 2000.

Career
Herbulot was ordained priest on 29 June 1950 for the Diocese of Reims. In 1972, he was appointed Vicar General of Reims.

Herbulot was appointed auxiliary bishop of the diocese of Reims in residence at Charleville-Mézières on 20 June 1974. On 12 May 1978, he was appointed bishop of Corbeil-Essonnes. He retired on 15 April 2000.

Personal life
Herbulot was born in Saint-Menges, France. He completed all of his training for the priesthood at the Grand Séminaire de Reims.

Herbulot died on 1 August 2021, aged 96.

Honors
 Knight of the National Order of the Legion of Honor

References

1925 births
2021 deaths
French Roman Catholic bishops
People from Ardennes (department)
Chevaliers of the Légion d'honneur